Bartholomew Albizzi (died 1361) was an Italian Franciscan hagiographer. He is known for his life of Gerardo Cagnoli.

External links
Franaut entry

1361 deaths
Italian Friars Minor
Italian religious writers
Christian hagiographers
Year of birth unknown